Elmo Nüganen (born on date 15 February 1962 in Jõhvi) is an Estonian theatre director, film director, and actor. He has been the artistic Director of the Tallinn City Theatre since 1992.

He was a graduate of the Estonian Academy of Music and Theatre in 1988 and then a professor at the academy in 1998–2002 and 2008–2012. He directed the war films Names in Marble from 2002 and 1944 from 2015. Names in Marble was seen by more than 168,000 people in Estonia and was selected for the 2003 Taormina Film Fest, while 1944 had the highest opening-week audience numbers in Estonian film history and became the country's submission for the Academy Awards.

Nüganen has received multiple awards for his work in theatre, including the Estonian Annual Theatre Award for Best Director in 1992, 1995, 2000, 2007, and 2010, and the Estonian National Cultural Award in 1996, 1999, and 2009.

Nüganen is married to actress Anne Reemann. They have three daughters, Saara, Maria-Netti, and Sonja.

Filmography
Actor
 Only Sunday (Ainus pühapäev) (1990)
 The Prompter (Suflöör) (1993)
 The Grey Light of November (Marraskuun harmaa valo) (1993)
 Armastus kolme apelsini vastu (1994)
 Names in Marble (Nimed marmortahvlil) (2002)
 Mushrooming (Seenelkäik) (2012)
 Purge (Puhdistus) (2012)
 Demons (Deemonid) (2012)
 Tangerines (Mandariinid) (2013)
 O2 (2020)
 Melchior the Apothecary: The Ghost (2022)

Director
 Names in Marble (Nimed marmortahvlil) (2002)
 Mindless (Meeletu) (2006)
 1944 (2015)
 Melchior the Apothecary (2022)
 Melchior the Apothecary. The Ghost (2022)
 Melchior the Apothecary. The Executioner's Daughter (2022)

References

External links
 Elmo Nüganen at the Estonian Movie Database 

1962 births
20th-century Estonian male actors
21st-century Estonian male actors
Estonian film directors
Estonian male film actors
Estonian male stage actors
Estonian theatre directors
People from Jõhvi
Living people
Estonian Academy of Music and Theatre alumni
Academic staff of the Estonian Academy of Music and Theatre
Recipients of the Order of the White Star, 3rd Class